Nigilgia adjectella is a moth in the family Brachodidae. It was described by Francis Walker in 1863. It is found in Sierra Leone, China, India, Sri Lanka and Australia.

References

Brachodidae
Moths described in 1863